The 2020 Wilmington mayoral election was held on Tuesday, November 3, 2020, to elect the mayor of Wilmington, Delaware. Incumbent mayor Mike Purzycki won re-election to a second term. Mike Purzycki first won election in 2016 with 82.2% of the vote.

Purzycki faced a competitive primary, winning the Democratic nomination by a 7.26% margin, a difference of 1,019 votes. Purzycki won 100% of the vote in the general election as he was the only candidate on the ballot.

Democratic primary

Candidates

Nominee
 Mike Purzycki, incumbent mayor

Eliminated in primary
 Velda Jones-Potter, Wilmington city treasurer
 Justen Wright, former Wilmington city councilman

Declined
 Dennis P. Williams, former mayor

Results

General election

Candidates
Mike Purzycki (Democratic), incumbent mayor

Results

References

Wilmington Mayor
Wilmington
Wilmington Mayor 2020
Election Mayor 2020